The boules sports events at the 2009 World Games in Kaohsiung was played between 20 and 22 July. 68 competitors, from 18 nations, participated in the tournament. The boules sports competition took place at 228 Memorial Park.

Participating nations

Medal table

Events

Men's events

Women's events

References

External links
 Boules sports on IWGA website
 Results

 
2009 World Games
2009